Stellar II may refer to:

Hyundai Stellar II, a Hyundai car in the late 1980s
Hasselblad Stellar II, a Hasselblad compact digital camera (based on the Sony Cyber-shot DSC-RX100M2) released in 2014

See also
Stellar (disambiguation)